Intersex Aotearoa is a nonprofit organisation based in New Zealand, and is a national advocacy and peer support organisation for intersex people. The organisation was founded in 1996 by Mani Mitchell, and has previously been known as the Intersex Trust Aotearoa New Zealand and Intersex Awareness New Zealand.

Mission 

ITANZ is a charitable trust that provides education, information and training on intersex issues for organisations and individual professionals. Executive Director Mani Mitchell is known as New Zealand's first "out" intersex person.

Activities 

The Trust works with the Human Rights Commission, Rainbow Youth in Auckland, Whanganui Women's Health Collective, and Working it Out in Tasmania.

Physical integrity and bodily autonomy 

Trust members have participated in, and jointly held, roundtable events with the Human Rights Commission, including on the human rights implications of intersex medical interventions, shame and secrecy. Following a joint round table event with the Human Rights Commission, the Commission proposed to the UN Committee on the Rights of the Child that the New Zealand government enact legal and regulatory safeguards to protect the rights of intersex children, and ensure that children's rights to bodily integrity, autonomy and self-determination are respected. In October 2016, the Committee on the Rights of the Child issued observations on practices in New Zealand, including recommendations to ensure "that no one is subjected to unnecessary medical or surgical treatment during infancy or childhood, guaranteeing the rights of children to bodily integrity, autonomy and self-determination". The recommendations of the Committee on the Rights of the Child have been illustrated by ITANZ and Intersex Youth Aotearoa.

In March 2017, representatives of Intersex Trust Aotearoa New Zealand participated in an Australian and Aotearoa/New Zealand consensus "Darlington Statement" by intersex community organizations and others. The statement calls for legal reform, including the criminalization of deferrable intersex medical interventions on children, an end to legal classification of sex, and improved access to peer support.

Counseling services 

Executive Director Mani Mitchell provides counselling for individuals and families.

Youth 

A youth project, Intersex Youth Aotearoa, was launched in September 2015 to provide information and support to youth with intersex conditions.

Education and awareness 

Mitchell, and other board members, have given presentations to a range of audiences, including the National College of Midwives biennial conference and the University of the Third Age. The Trust have supported the filming of award-winning documentary Intersexion (2012).

International organizing 
Mitchell co-organized the third International Intersex Forum in Malta, 2013.

Affiliations 
ITANZ a member of the International Lesbian, Gay, Bisexual, Trans and Intersex Association.

See also 
 Intersex human rights
 Intersex rights in New Zealand

References

External links 

Intersex rights organizations
Political advocacy groups in New Zealand
Intersex medical and health organizations
Intersex support groups
Gender in New Zealand
Charitable trusts
Intersex rights in New Zealand